

France
Martinique –
 Louis Thomas Villaret de Joyeuse, (1802–1806)

Ottoman Empire
 Principality of Abkhazia – Kelesh Begi (1789–1806)

Portugal
 Angola –
 Miguel António de Melo, Governor of Angola (1797–1802)
 Fernão António de Noronha, Governor of Angola (1802–1806)
 Macau – Jose Manuel Pinto, Governor of Macau (1800–1803)

Spanish Empire
Viceroyalty of New Granada – Pedro Mendinueta y Múzquiz (1797–1803)
Viceroyalty of New Spain – Félix Berenguer de Marquina (1800–1803)
Captaincy General of Cuba – Salvador de Muro y Salazar, Governor of Cuba (1799–1812)
Spanish East Indies – Rafael María de Aguilar y Ponce de León, Governor-General of the Philippines (1793–1806)
Commandancy General of the Provincias Internas –
 Pedro da Nava, Commandant General of the Interior Provinces (1793–1802)
 Nemesio Salcedo y Salcedo (1802–1813)
Viceroyalty of Peru – Gabriel de Avilés y del Fierro (1801–1806)
Captaincy General of Chile –
 Francisco Tadeo Diez de Medina Vidanges, Royal Governor of Chile (1802–1808)
 Luis Muñoz de Guzmán, Royal Governor of Chile (1802–1808)
Viceroyalty of the Río de la Plata – Joaquín del Pino y Rozas (1801–1804)

United Kingdom
 Bermuda – George Beckwith, Governor of Bermuda (1798–1803)
 Cayman Islands – William Bodden, Chief Magistrate of the Cayman Islands (1776–1823)
 Ceylon – Frederick North, Governor of Ceylon (1798–1805)
 Madras – edward Clive, Governor of Madras (1798–1803)
 Malta Protectorate
 Charles Cameron, Civil Commissioner of Malta (1801–1802)
 Alexander Ball, Civil Commissioner of Malta (1802–1809)
 New South Wales – Philip Gidley King, Governor of New South Wales (1800–1806)
Martinique –
 Sir William Keppel, (1796–1802)

Colonial governors
Colonial governors
1802